3-Chloropropionitrile is an organic compound with the formula ClCH2CH2CN.  A colorless liquid, it is prepared by the reaction of hydrogen chloride with acrylonitrile.  It is used commercially as a precursor to the drug famotidine.

It is an alkylating agent, as illustrated by its reaction with imidazoles to give the cyanoethylated imidazolium salts. Similarly, it alkylates thiourea, en route to 3-mercaptopropionitrile.

References

Nitriles